Petritoli is a comune (municipality) in the Province of Fermo in the Italian region Marche, located about  south of Ancona and about  north of Ascoli Piceno.

Petritoli borders the following municipalities: Carassai, Monte Giberto, Monte Vidon Combatte, Montefiore dell'Aso, Monterubbiano, Ponzano di Fermo.

Twin towns
 Vidor, Italy

References

External links 

 

Cities and towns in the Marche